A slide is a part of a wind instrument consisting of two (or more) pieces of tubing fitted one closely inside the other, and used to vary the overall length of the tube, and therefore the pitch of the instrument. Often two sets of tubes are used, with a U bend attaching them; this arrangement is called a single slide. A double slide, where two U-shaped slides are braced together and move on four inner tubes, is found on the B♭ contrabass trombone.

Slides are used in three main ways:

 In instruments such as the trombone and slide whistle, moving the slide is the way to select the note while playing.
 On most brass instruments, a tuning slide is used to adjust the main pitch of the instrument before playing. A modern double or triple french horn has several tuning slides, which are sometimes moved during performance.
 In instruments such as the trumpet and tuba, small valve slides are moved manually or by means of a trigger while playing, to correct the pitch of the note selected by the valves.

References
 

Musical instrument parts and accessories
Brass instrument parts and accessories